Rong Kham is a district (amphoe) in the southern part of Kalasin province, northeastern Thailand.

Geography
Neighboring districts are (from the west clockwise): Kamalasai of Kalasin Province; Pho Chai, and Chiang Khwan of Roi Et province.

History
The minor district (king amphoe) was created on 1 February 1973, when tambons Rong Kham and Samakkhi were split off from the district Kamalasai. It was upgraded to a full district on 10 October 1993.

Administration
The district is divided into three sub-districts (tambons), which are further subdivided into 44 villages (mubans). Rong Kham is a township (thesaban tambon) which covers parts of tambon Rong Kham. There are a further two tambon administrative organizations (TAO).

References

External links
amphoe.com

Rong Kham